Kalpana Pariyar (born 19 January 1995) is a Nepalese professional Shooter, she represented Nepal in The International Shooting Sport Federation (ISSF) Tournament in the Women's 10 metre air rifle event.

Career
 In 2018,  she participated in the 2018 Asian Games and secured 45th place in the Women's 10 metre air rifle event
 In 2019, she won silver medal in the XIII South Asian Games 2019 and participated in the World Cup and Asian Championship.

Achievements

2020 Summer Olympic 
She qualified for Olympic Games at Tokyo, Japan after wild cards qualifying spots for Asian Shooters by the International Olympic Committee (IOC) Tripartite Commission to represent Nepal in Women's 10 metre air rifle  at the Shooting competition of the 2020 Summer Olympics in Tokyo, Japan.

Tournaments Record

References

External links
 

1995 births
Living people
Nepalese female sport shooters
Shooters at the 2018 Asian Games
Asian Games competitors for Nepal
South Asian Games silver medalists for Nepal
Nepalese people
Olympic shooters of Nepal
Shooters at the 2020 Summer Olympics
Khas people